Nura District is a district of Karaganda Region in central Kazakhstan. The administrative center of the district is the settlement of Nura. The district has a population of 22,569 as of 2019.

History 
During the 1890s, a number of Ukrainians, Russians, and Germans began constructing settlements in the area, which was already home to approximately 330 villages of the native Kazakh people. On April 19, 1923, by order of the Kirghiz SSR, the Nurinsk Volost was created as part of the Akmola Uyezd. On March 10, 1932, the Nurinsk Volost joined the newly created Karagandy Oblast. Nura became the district's administrative center in 1928.

The 1930s saw a number of modernization programs implemented in the district, with electricity, telephones, and postal services being introduced. 16 schools were erected as part of a wider Soviet program to combat illiteracy known as likbez.

During World War II, over 3,000 people from the district fought in the war, and 1,083 died in battle. Two residents of the district were awarded the Hero of the Soviet Union medal.

From 1954 to 1957, 7 state farms were created in the district as part of the Virgin Lands Program.

Demographics 

Ethnic composition

Notable people 

 Nikolai Alexeyevich Kuznetsov, Soviet aviator

References 

Districts of Kazakhstan
Karaganda Region